Saint Paul University Iloilo, also referred to by its acronym SPUI or SPU Iloilo, St. Paul, St. Paul's, is a private Catholic basic and higher education institution run by the Philippine Province of the Congregation of the Sisters of Saint Paul of Chartres in Iloilo City, Iloilo, Philippines. It is one of the six campuses comprising the Saint Paul University System. It was founded in 1946 by the Sisters of Saint Paul of Chartres from France with the help of American Catholics. It presently offers academic programs in basic education, tertiary and post-graduate studies in the fields of information technology, teacher education, business, accountancy, liberal studies, nursing, and physical therapy.

At present though SPUI form part of the Saint Paul University System, it remains distinctively independent with its own administration.

History
The Sisters of St. Paul of Chartres began their apostolic activities in Iloilo by establishing St. Paul’s Hospital in 1911. Their primary aim was to care for the poor and the sick. The Sisters under the leadership of Mother Josephine de Jesus opened a school of nursing in June 1946 to meet the pressing need of the hospital for trained competent Catholic nurses. The school was upgraded into a College with the opening of the Arts and Science courses, namely Bachelor of Art in Mass Communication, Bachelor of Science in Biology. Nutrition, Psychology and the 2-year Certificate Courses Diploma in Dietetic Technician, and Junior Secretarial. Nursing was offered as a 5-year BSN program.  The school was formally granted a university charter in 2004.

See also
St. Paul University Philippines, Tuguegarao City
St. Paul University Manila, Metro Manila
St. Paul University Quezon City, Metro Manila
St. Paul University at San Miguel, Bulacan
St. Paul University Dumaguete, Negros Oriental
St. Paul University Surigao, Surigao del Norte

References

External links
 
 

Universities and colleges in Iloilo City
Catholic universities and colleges in the Philippines